Connah's Quay High School (CQHS) is an 11–16 mixed, English-medium, community comprehensive secondary school in Connah's Quay, Flintshire, Wales.

A £2.3 million science, English and music wing was completed in October 2002, after a two-year project also involving extensions and redevelopment of the existing buildings. When Prince Andrew, Duke of York visited the school to declare the new block officially open, the opening ceremony was interrupted by a fire alarm caused by a hot tea urn. Connahs Quay High School underwent further modernisation in 2018, with the demolition and complete rebuild of the old food and design wing.

References 

Secondary schools in Flintshire